Phalangium is a genus of harvestmen that occur mostly in the Old World. The best known species is Phalangium opilio, which is so common in many temperate regions that it is simply called "harvestman".

Species
The genus Phalangium contains the following species:

 Phalangium aegyptiacum Savigny, 1816 (Egypt)
 Phalangium bilineatum Fabricius, 1779
 Phalangium cancroides Müller, 1776
 Phalangium clavipus Roewer, 1911 (Majorca)
 Phalangium conigerum Sørensen, 1912
 Phalangium coronatum Fabricius, 1779
 Phalangium crassum Dufour, 1831
 Phalangium cristatum Olivier, 1791
 Phalangium grossipes Müller, 1776
 Phalangium iberica Schenkel, 1939 (Spain)
 Phalangium incanum C. L. Koch, 1839
 Phalangium licenti Schenkel, 1953
 Phalangium ligusticum (Roewer, 1923) (Liguria, Italy)
 Phalangium lineola Dufour, 1831
 Phalangium litorale Störm, 1762
 Phalangium lupatum Eichwald, 1830
 Phalangium mamillatum Gervais, 1844 (Spain)
 Phalangium mesomelas Soerensen, 1910 (Kilimanjaro)
 Phalangium minutum Meade, 1861
 Phalangium mucronatum Müller, 1776
 Phalangium muscorum Latreille, 1802
 Phalangium opilio Linnaeus, 1761 (Holarctic)
 Phalangium ortoni Wood, 1869 (Ecuador)
 Phalangium pallidum Müller, 1776
 Phalangium palmatum Herbst, 1797
 Phalangium punctipes (L. Koch, 1878) (Armenia)
 Phalangium pygnogonum Müller, 1776
 Phalangium riedeli Starega, 1973
 Phalangium rubens Hermann, 1804
 Phalangium rudipalpe Gervais, 1849
 Phalangium savignyi Savignyi, 1826 (Egypt, Italy)
 Phalangium spiniferum Cantor, 1842 (Zhoushan, China)
 Phalangium targionii (Canestrini, 1871) (Mediterranean)
 Phalangium tricuspidatum Dufour, 1831
 Phalangium uncatum Hermann, 1804 (Austria)

Valid species (as of 2014)

Of the 35 species listed above, 6 are valid [P. ligusticum, P. opilio (originally described in 1758, not 1761), P. punctipes, P. riedeli, P. savignyi (originally described by Audouin, not Savigny) & P. targionii], 3 belong to different genera of the opiliones, 4 belong to different arachnid orders, 2 are species inquirenda and 20 are nomina dubia.

The type species is P. opilio, not P. iberica [which has been synonymised with Metaphalangium cirtanum (CL Koch, 1839)], as designated by Latreille in 1810.

In addition to the 6 valid names from the above list, the genus Bactrophalangium (with its 2 species) has been synonymized into Phalangium, 8 species have been described since 2005 and one species described in 1953 is missing from the above list, making a total of 17 species currently recognized as valid.

References

Harvestmen